The 2011 FIBA U16 European Championship Division C was held in Serravalle, San Marino, from 12 to 17 July 2011. Six teams participated in the competition.

Participating teams
 
 

 (hosts)

Group phase

Group A

Group B

Knockout stage

Bracket

Final standings

2010–11 in European basketball
FIBA Europe Under-16 Championship
July 2011 sports events in Europe
FIBA U16 European Championship Division C